Nakhl-e Yusef (also Romanized as Nakhl-e Yūsef; also known as Nakhl-e Moḩammad Yūsef) is a village in Moghuyeh Rural District, in the Central District of Bandar Lengeh County, Hormozgan Province, Iran. At the 2006 census, its population was 95, in 17 families.

References 

Populated places in Bandar Lengeh County